Propebela profundicola is a species of sea snail, a marine gastropod mollusk in the family Mangeliidae.

Description
The length of the shell attains 13.3 mm, its diameter 6.2 mm.

Distribution
This marine species was found off Monterey Bay, California

References

  Bartsch, P, Some turrid mollusks of Monterey Bay and vicinity; Proceedings of the Biological Society of Washington, v. 57 p. 57–68

External links
 Smith & Gordon, Mollusks of Monterey Bay; Proceedings of the California Academy of Sciences, 4th series, vol. 26
 

profundicola
Gastropods described in 1944